The shires of Scotland, or counties of Scotland, are historic subdivisions of Scotland established in the Middle Ages and used as administrative divisions until 1975. Originally established for judicial purposes (being the territory over which a sheriff had jurisdiction), from the 17th century they started to be used for local administration purposes as well. The areas used for judicial functions (sheriffdoms) came to diverge from the shires, which ceased to be used for local government purposes after 1975 under the Local Government (Scotland) Act 1973.

Today, local government in Scotland is based upon council areas, which sometimes incorporate county names, but frequently have vastly different boundaries. Counties continue to be used for land registration, and form the basis of the lieutenancy areas (although the latter are not entirely identical).

History

Sheriffdoms or shires

Malcolm III (reigned 1058 to 1093) appears to have introduced sheriffs as part of a policy of replacing previous forms of government with French feudal structures. This policy was continued by Edgar (reigned 1097 to 1107), Alexander I (reigned 1107 to 1124), and in particular David I (reigned 1124 to 1153). David completed the division of the country into sheriffdoms by the conversion of existing thanedoms. The earliest sheriffdom south of the Forth which we know of for certain is Haddingtonshire, which is named in a charter of 1139 as Hadintunschira and in another of 1141 as Hadintunshire. Stirlingshire appears in a charter of 1150 under the name Striuelinschire.

The shires of the Highlands were completed only in the reign of King Charles I (reigned 1625 to 1649).

Shires extant by 1305
In 1305 Edward I of England, who had deposed John Balliol, issued an ordinance for the government of Scotland. The document listed the twenty-three shires then existing and either appointed new sheriffs or continued heritable sheriffs in office.

 Gospatric was mentioned as sheriff in a number of charters of Earl David. The shire was not listed in the ordinance, and in 1305 appears to have been partly under the jurisdiction of the sheriff of Selkirk, with the remainder comprised in the constabularies of Jedburgh and Roxburgh under the jurisdiction of the constable of Berwick. The shire was one of those surrendered to Edward III of England in 1334.

Shires formed after 1305
The remaining shires were formed either by the territorial expansion of the Kingdom of Scotland, or by the subdivision of existing sheriffdoms. Many of the new shires had highly irregular boundaries or detached parts as they united the various possessions of the heritable sheriffs.
: Argyll (or Argyle): lordship subdued by Alexander II in 1222. Norwegian claims over the area finally ended in 1266. First record of appointment of sheriff dates from 1326.
1369: Kirkcudbright: formed when area between Rivers Nith and Cree granted to Archibald the Grim. Archibald appointed a steward to administer the area, hence it became a "stewartry".
: Bute: the islands formed part of Kintyre district of Argyll. A heritable sheriff was appointed to the shire in 1388.
1402: Renfrew: separated from the Shire of Lanark by Robert III.
 Tarbertshire: existed from before 1481, when it gained territory from Perthshire, until 1633, when it was annexed to Argyll.
1503: Ross: formed from part of Inverness by act of parliament during the reign of James IV, the sheriff to sit at Tain or Dingwall. Sheriffs were seldom appointed, and further acts of 1649 and 1661 restated its separation from Inverness. The 1661 act also clarified the area encompassed, based on the pre-Reformation Diocese of Ross. Sir George Mackenzie's Ross-shire estates were transferred to Cromartyshire by a 1685 act of parliament (repealed 1686, re-enacted 1690). 
1503: Caithness: formed from part of Inverness by the same 1503 act as Ross-shire, the sheriff to sit at Dornoch or Wick. The area of the sheriffdom was to be identical to that of the Diocese of Caithness.
1581: Orkney: erected into a lordship with the right of sheriffship. It was annexed to the Crown in 1612, although the term "lordship" continued to be applied to the area.
1633: Sutherland: separated from Inverness.

 In 1583 the Earl of Huntly, hereditary sheriff of Inverness, granted the Earl of Sutherland jurisdiction over the sheriffdom of Sutherland and Strathnaver. This was only the south-eastern area of the later county, with Halladale River forming the boundary. The shire was formed in 1631 by crown writ of Charles I, severing Sutherland from Inverness. The new county comprised the Earldom of Sutherland along with Assynt and the baronies between Ross and Caithness. Dornoch was appointed the head burgh of the shire. The writ was confirmed by the Parliament of Scotland in 1633.

1707 Act of Union and the ending of heritable jurisdictions
From the 17th century the shires (counties) started to be used for local administration apart from judicial functions. In 1667 Commissioners of Supply were appointed in each sheriffdom to collect the land tax. The commissioners eventually assumed other duties in the county. Following the union of Scotland with England, the government began bringing Scotland's local governance into line with the rest of Great Britain. The full machinery of county government was not immediately established, largely due to the fact that the office of sheriff or steward had become hereditary in certain families in the majority of sheriffdoms. At the accession of George II twenty-two sheriffs were hereditary, three were appointed for life and only eight held office at the pleasure of the monarch. The heritable sheriffdoms were Argyll, Bute, Banff, Caithness, Clackmannan, Cromarty, Dumbarton, Dumfries, Elgin, Fife, Kinross, Kirkcudbright, Linlithgow, Nairn, Orkney & Zetland, Peebles, Renfrew, Roxburgh, Selkirk, Sutherland, Stirling and Wigtown; those appointed for life were Perth, Forfar and Ayr; those held at pleasure were Aberdeen, Berwick, Edinburgh, Haddington, Inverness, Kincardine, Lanark and Ross. Following the unsuccessful Jacobite Rising of 1745 the government took the opportunity of overhauling county government. The Heritable Jurisdictions Act 1747 revested the government of the shires in the Crown, compensating those office holders who were displaced. The Sheriffs (Scotland) Act 1747 reduced the office of sheriff principal to a largely ceremonial one, with a sheriff depute or sheriff substitute appointed to each "county, shire or stewartry". Twelve of the smallest counties were paired to form sheriffdoms, a process of amalgamation that was to continue until the twentieth century, and thus led to the sheriffdoms and the shires having different boundaries. In 1794 Lord-Lieutenants were appointed to each county, and in 1797 county militia regiments were raised, bringing Scotland into line with England, Wales and Ireland.

Later developments

In 1858 police forces were established in each shire under the Police (Scotland) Act 1857. Burghs were largely outside the jurisdiction of shire authorities.

Under the Local Government (Scotland) Act 1889, thirty-four county councils were formed. The areas governed by these councils, referred to as "administrative counties", resembled the traditional shires of Scotland, but not entirely. Exclaves were abolished, with the exception of one exclave of Dunbartonshire. Ross-shire and Cromartyshire were merged into Ross and Cromarty, and four cities - Aberdeen, Dundee, Edinburgh and Glasgow - were made counties in their own right. These "counties of cities" were periodically expanded as their urban areas spread further and further into the surrounding countryside. In general, they were still considered part of the wider geographical county; for instance, Glasgow was still reckoned part of Lanarkshire, though it was no longer within the jurisdiction of Lanark County Council.

Under the Local Government (Scotland) Act 1929, two pairs of councils were combined with each other to form the "joint county councils" of Perth & Kinross and Moray & Nairn. Though governed by the same council, each county remained nominally independent from the other.

In 1963 the Government published a white paper which proposed a reduction in the number of counties from thirty-three to between ten and fifteen. A process of consultation between county councils and officials from the Scottish Office was begun to effect the amalgamations. Following a change of government, it was announced in 1965 that a "more comprehensive and authoritative" review of local government areas would be undertaken.

In 1966 a Royal Commission on Local Government in Scotland, chaired by Lord Wheatley, was appointed. The commission's report in 1969 recommended the replacement of the counties with larger regions.

In 1970 another change in government control was followed by the publication of a white paper in 1971 implementing the commission's reforms in a modified form. The abolition of counties "for local government purposes" was enacted by the Local Government (Scotland) Act 1973, with counties playing no part in local government after 16 May 1975, being replaced by regions and districts.

Local government was reorganised again under the Local Government etc. (Scotland) Act 1994, with the regions and districts being replaced by the currently existing council areas. These councils are unitary, meaning they undertake all local governance within their area, though "community councils" do operate in several towns.

The historic counties of Scotland are included in the Index of Place Names (IPN) published by the Office for National Statistics. Each "place" included in the IPN is related to the historic county it lies within, as well as to a set of administrative areas.

Names
In official documents shires were referred to as the Shire of X, rather than X Shire. The latter was more common in general usage. Thus in parliamentary proceedings one may find, for example, a heading referring to "Act for the shirrefdome of Dumbartane" but the text "the sevine kirkis to Dumbartane schyr."

The first accurate county maps of Scotland appear in the late seventeenth century and contain a first-hand record of shire names. John Adair (maps c. 1682) gives the names of Midlothian, East Lothian, Twaddall and Wast Lothian (the latter also as "Linlithgowshire"). The eighteenth century county maps of Herman Moll (dated c. 1745) preferred to keep the "Shire" suffix a separate word, as for example "Berwick Shire", "Roxburgh Shire", "the Shire of Selkirk otherwise known as Etterick Forest", and in the north to "Murray" (Moray), "Inverness Shire", "Aberdeen Shire", "Banff Shire", "Ross Shire". The map of Boswell's and Johnson's A Journey to the Western Islands of Scotland (1773) gives "Shire" to every one shown, including "Angus Shire" and "Fife Shire".

Several shires have alternative names of long standing. These include:

Angus – Forfarshire
East Lothian – Haddingtonshire
Kincardineshire – The Mearns
Midlothian – Edinburghshire
Moray – Elginshire
Peeblesshire – Tweeddale
Roxburghshire – Teviotdale
Selkirkshire – Ettrick Forest
West Lothian – Linlithgowshire

In Scotland, as in England and Wales, the terms "shire" and "county" have been used interchangeably, with the latter becoming more common in later usage. Today, "county" is more commonly used, with "shire" being seen as a more poetic or archaic variant.

Lists of shires

Counties until 1890

The map depicts a large number of exclaves physically detached from the county that they were politically deemed to be part of. Cromartyshire's borders, a particularly fragmentary example, were achieved as late as 1685, although at that time the word "county" was not applied to the sheriffdom.

Counties from 1890 to 1975

See also
List of Local Government Areas in Scotland (1930-75)
History of local government in the United Kingdom
List of counties of Scotland in 1951 by population and by area
List of counties of Scotland in 1971 by population
List of Scottish counties by highest point
List of burghs in Scotland
Local government areas of Scotland 1973 to 1996
Lieutenancy areas of Scotland
Subdivisions of Scotland
List of places in Scotland
Counties of the United Kingdom

References

External links

 The Historic Counties Trust
Campaign for Historic Counties
 Interactive map of the historic counties
 Records of the Parliaments of Scotland
 The National Library of Scotland: Maps of Scotland

 
Counties Scotland